The Akatek (Akateko) are a Maya people of Guatemala. Their indigenous Akatek language belongs to the Q'anjobalan branch of Mayan languages. Most Akatek live in San Miguel Acatán and San Rafael La Independencia, in the department of Huehuetenango.

Notes

Indigenous peoples in Guatemala
Maya peoples
Mesoamerican cultures
Huehuetenango Department